Trelleborg Old Water Tower is a now defunct water tower in Stadsparken, Trelleborg in southern Sweden.

The erection of the water tower was initiated 1911 after drawings by the architect Ivar Tengbom, and was finished 1912. The uppermost three meters of the building is a copper-plated spire, a spire decorated by two spheres – one being  in diameter, the other  in diameter. The water tower was in use until 1974, when Trelleborg New Water Tower took over its functions. Except a café at street level the water tower stands unused.

References 

Towers completed in 1912
Water towers in Sweden
Buildings and structures in Skåne County
1912 establishments in Sweden